Dysartia is a genus of fly in the family Chloropidae. they are known to be predaceous on Grasshopper eggs.

Species
D. latigena Sabrosky 1991

References

Europe
Nearctic

Chloropidae genera